John Jerome Gorman (June 2, 1883 – February 24, 1949) was a U.S. Representative from Illinois.

Born in Minneapolis, Minnesota, Gorman attended the common schools and the Bryant and Stratton Business College at Chicago, Illinois.
He served as clerk and letter carrier in the Chicago city post office 1902-1918.
He studied law at Loyola University Chicago School of Law and graduated in 1914.
He was admitted to the bar in 1914 and commenced practice in Chicago.
He served as delegate to the State constitutional convention in 1920.

Gorman was elected as a Republican to the Sixty-seventh Congress (March 4, 1921 – March 3, 1923).
He was an unsuccessful candidate for reelection.
He resumed the practice of law at Chicago.

Gorman was elected to the Sixty-ninth Congress (March 4, 1925 – March 3, 1927).
He was an unsuccessful candidate for reelection.
He resumed the practice of law in Chicago.

On April 14, 1927, Chicago Mayor William Hale Thompson appointed former U.S. congressman Gorman as a special assistant corporation counsel, with the assignment of looking through school textbooks for lies and distortions. Thompson had been accusing Superintendent of Chicago Public Schools William McAndrew of conspiring with Great Britain to spread propaganda to indoctrinate students against the United States. Gorman, who was considered an Anglophobe, reached the conclusion that books used by Chicago Public Schools were "poisoned" with British dogma, and that the British were taking over America, "not by shot and shell, but by a rain of propaganda." This would echo charges levied in the administrative hearing of William McAndrew before the Chicago Board of Education. As a witness during McAndrew's administrative hearing, Gorman accused McAndrew of placing British propaganda in the school curriculum, and attacked McAndrew for the use of a textbook written by David Saville Muzzey. Gorman would later write an apology letter on October 11, 1929, admitting that he had never actually read that textbook and that the sworn statements he had made were, in fact, written by someone else. He claimed to have been misled, and to have now realized there was nothing to criticize in Muzzey's textbooks. As a consequence of this perjury, Gorman was disbarred by the Supreme Court of Illinois in December 1931.

After his death in Chicago in 1949, he was interred in All Saints Cemetery.

References

1883 births
1949 deaths
Loyola University Chicago School of Law alumni
Republican Party members of the United States House of Representatives from Illinois
Politicians from Chicago
20th-century American politicians